With MiFID II directive being in force in January 2018, Approved Publication Arrangements (APA) data should  increase transparency in the OTC markets by publishing quotes for pre-trade transparency, and trades for post-trade transparency. An APA is an organisation authorised to publish trade reports on behalf of investment firms according to Article (4)(1)(52) MiFID II.

In finance, people usually use APA to refer to the data they provide, and not only the organization which provides the data.

Background 
APAs, Approved Reporting Mechanisms and Consolidated Tape Providers are new categories of Data Reporting Services Providers (DRSPs) that did not exist under MiFID I.

For the APA data, one distinguishes three asset classes: bonds, derivatives of all kind (interest rate/Credit/FX/Commodity/Equity), and Structured Finance. Each APA data record contains information such as
 Agreement Time and Date in the variable TRADING_DATE_AND_TIME in ISO 8601 format, e.g. 2019-08-08T03:14:15.926000+00:00
 Publication Time
 ISIN to uniquely identify the financial instrument (if INSTRUMENT_ID_TYPE is set to ISIN), for instance  INSTRUMENT_ID=HU0000403118 refers to a government bond of Hungary with maturity date 2027-10-27. 
 Name of the financial instrument
 Price (and currency)
 Volume
 Trade type (INSTRUMENT_ID_TYPE)

Example 
A (shortened) example record in JSON format looks like this:
[
  {
    "TRADING_DATE_AND_TIME": "2019-08-08T03:14:15.926000+00:00",
    "INSTRUMENT_ID_TYPE": "ISIN",
    "INSTRUMENT_ID": "HU0000403118",
    "PRICE": 111.2548,
    "VENUE_OF_EXECUTION": "SINT",
    "PRICE_NOTATION": "PERC",
    "PRICE_CURRENCY": "HUF",
    "NOTATION_OF_QUANTITY_IN_MEASUREMENT_UNIT": "N/A",
    "QUANTITY_IN_MEASUREMENT_UNIT": "N/A",
    "QUANTITY": 1,
    "NOTIONAL_AMOUNT": 500000000,
    "NOTIONAL_CURRENCY": "HUF",
    "PUBLICATION_DATE_AND_TIME": "2019-08-08T07:58:31.154134+00:00",
    "VENUE_OF_PUBLICATION": "BAPA",
    "TRANSACTION_ID": "12345678-aaaa-bbbb-cccc-1234567890ab",
  }
]

See also 
 Request for quote
 LEI
 ISIN
 MiFID II

References 

Further reading:
 https://www.cnbc.com/2017/12/15/mifid-2-all-you-need-to-know.html ― a concise summary on the topic, understandable for laymen.

Finance